David Weissman is a filmmaker, producer and director. His works include the Emmy-nominated We Were Here documentary and The Cockettes, and he is also the director of short films.

Early life 
Weissman was raised in Los Angeles and went to University High School. After moving to San Francisco in 1976, he worked in restaurants, was politically active, and took film classes at City College of San Francisco. He also worked as a legislative aide to San Francisco Supervisor Harry Britt, who served after the assassination of Harvey Milk.

Career 
Weissman began filmmaking as a student at the City College of San Francisco in the early 1980s. Beginning in the mid-1980s, he began producing short films. In 1990, he was the first recipient of the Sundance Institute Mark Silverman Fellowship for New Producers, which included an internship on the Joel and Ethan Coen film Barton Fink. He later worked as assistant cameraperson on the Oscar-winning documentary film In the Shadow of the Stars and as well as Terry Zwigoff's Crumb. 

In the 1990s, Weissman produced a series of public service announcements that focused on the emotional and psychological toll facing HIV-negative gay men during the AIDS epidemic in the United States. He produced and co-directed the 2002 documentary The Cockettes, which was screened at the Sundance Film Festival. In 2008, he reconnected with Bill Weber, his filmmaking partner for The Cockettes, to film interviews that became the basis for the film We Were Here, released in 2011 at the Sundance Film Festival and in 2012 as a PBS Independent Lens documentary.

In 2014, he began working on a documentary interview series, Conversations with Gay Elders, in which he works in partnership with gay men in their 20s and 30s as editors to profile gay men in their 70s and 80s. The first interview in the series was released in 2017. Six interviews have so far been released.

In 2007, Weissman co-founded QDoc, a queer documentary film festival in Portland, Oregon.

References

American documentary filmmakers
People from Los Angeles
Living people
Year of birth missing (living people)